Wesley Autrey (born February 6, 1956) (dubbed by the media as the "Subway Samaritan", "Subway Superman", "The Hero of Harlem" and as the "Subway Hero") is a New York City construction worker and Navy veteran who in 2007 achieved international recognition after he saved Cameron Hollopeter, a film student who had suffered a seizure and fallen onto the tracks, from being struck by a New York City Subway train. He is on the 2007 edition of Time 100 most influential people in the world list, made by Time magazine; the text about him was written by Donald Trump.

Subway incident
On January 2, 2007, Autrey was waiting for a train at the 137th Street–City College station in Manhattan with his two young daughters. At around 12:45 p.m., he and two women noticed a young man, Cameron Hollopeter, having a seizure. Autrey borrowed a pen and used it to keep Hollopeter's jaw open. Following the seizure, Hollopeter stumbled from the platform, falling onto the tracks.

As Hollopeter lay on the tracks, Autrey saw the lights of an oncoming 1 train. As one of the women held Autrey's daughters back away from the edge of the platform, Autrey dove onto the tracks. He thought he would be able to take Hollopeter off the tracks, but he realized there was not enough time to drag Hollopeter away. Instead, he protected Hollopeter by throwing himself over Hollopeter's body in a drainage trench between the tracks, where he held him down. Though the operator of the train applied the brakes, all but two  cars still passed over them, close enough to leave grease on his cap.

Immediate response and honors
Autrey told The New York Times “I don’t feel like I did something spectacular; I just saw someone who needed help. I did what I felt was right.”
Wesley is a member of the LIUNA union, Local 79, and credits his training with having helped him make the split-second decision: “Since I do construction work with Local 79, we work in confined spaces a lot. So I looked, and my judgment was pretty right. The train did have enough room for me.”

Autrey went to Hollopeter's hospital room and met his family. Hollopeter's father Larry said:

Media attention  
By the end of the next day, Autrey received a flood of gifts and phone calls of praise from complete strangers. He received $5,000 cash and $5,000 in scholarships for his daughters from Jerry Sherlock, the president of the New York Film Academy where Hollopeter attends school. Autrey also received $10,000 from Donald Trump.  He was interviewed for several national morning news programs and was invited to be a guest by David Letterman, Charlie Rose and Ellen DeGeneres, among others. Autrey, who had been wearing a periwinkle blue beanie with a Playboy Bunny logo, received a lifetime subscription to Playboy, a new beanie, and additional Playboy merchandise. Autrey also earned the title "hero of Harlem" and also received a trip to Walt Disney World Resort. On the January 9, 2007 airing of The Ellen DeGeneres Show, he was presented with a $5,000 Gap gift card, tickets and backstage passes to the next Beyoncé concert in New York, season tickets to the New Jersey Nets, a signed jersey from Jason Kidd, a brand new Jeep Patriot, two years' of car insurance from Progressive and a one-year free parking pass for use anywhere in NYC. His daughters were given new computers that will be updated every three years until they graduate from high school.

Autrey, a construction worker, had been working on converting classrooms into a library at PS 380, John Wayne Elementary School, in Brooklyn. The New York Daily News' Michael Daly said that the school was named after the actor (a District 14 superintendent was a "big fan") but the school should be renamed after Autrey instead.

On May 21, 2007, Autrey, who claimed to make $1,200 a week in his construction job, appeared as a contestant on the NBC game show Deal or No Deal. He received offers up to $305,000, but after opening the million dollars in the last round, he went home with just $25 in his Case #7. As a token for his bravery, Chrysler donated a Jeep Patriot which was awarded to him (host Howie Mandel stated this would have happened regardless of how Autrey fared in the game); this was the second Jeep Patriot awarded to him which was valued at $24,710 plus the $25 that he had in his case for his total winnings of $24,735.

Bronze medallion ceremony
On January 4, 2007, New York City Mayor Michael Bloomberg presented Autrey with the Bronze Medallion, New York City's highest award for exceptional citizenship and outstanding achievement, saying:

New MTA executive director Elliott "Lee" Sander thanked him as well, saying:

Sander gave Autrey a year of free subway rides - 12 unlimited monthly MetroCards plus various items of MTA merchandise for Autrey's young daughters. Also at the ceremony, Walt Disney World ambassador Lowell Doringo thanked Autrey and gave him and his family a week-long all-expenses paid trip to Disney World, as well as tickets to see The Lion King on Broadway. He also handed out Mickey Mouse ears and Mickey and Minnie plush toys to his daughters.

State of the Union and CNN ceremony 
On January 23, 2007, Autrey and his daughters were guests of President George W. Bush, seated in the balcony along with Dikembe Mutombo and others, at Bush's 2007 State of the Union Address to the United States Congress. Bush said of Autrey:

After Bush's remarks Autrey received a long standing ovation. Autrey proceeded to gesture outward to the crowd in thanks, shook the hands of First Lady Laura Bush, Second Lady Lynne Cheney, and embraced fellow honored guest Sgt. Tommy Rieman in a bear hug.

Rep. Joseph Crowley of Queens gave Bush credit for inviting Autrey and his daughters. Crowley commented on Bush's invitation to Autrey:

In December 2007, in a ceremony hosted by CNN to honor heroes who have made a difference in the world, Autrey received the "Everyday Hero" award.

Aftermath
In late March 2007, Autrey sued a lawyer and his Hollywood agent, alleging they tricked him into signing a "one-sided" contract. The lawyer, Diane Kleiman, claimed that Autrey signed the contract willingly and was trying to get out of the contract because he wanted to work with someone else. According to the Associated Press, the contract between Autrey and Kleiman, which Autrey said he signed without reading, gave Kleiman exclusive rights to Autrey's name and ownership of his story, as well as 50% of Autrey's earnings. The lawsuit was settled later that year with the contract voided.

In 2009, Autrey was featured in the documentary Starsuckers, where he discussed his sudden fame.

In 2012, shortly after the fifth anniversary of his subway heroics, Autrey was featured on a CBS News story in New York City, which reported he was "a sought-after speaker" who still worked in construction and was raising his 9- and 11-year-old daughters. In July 2013 Autrey endorsed Mark D. Levine for City Council in his local New York City district.

Autrey retired in 2022. He made the news again in December 2022 for winning a Publishers Clearing House sweepstakes for a Ford Bronco Wildtrak vehicle worth over $52,000.

In popular culture
An episode of the television show 30 Rock entitled "Subway Hero" features Dennis Duffy, a recurring character, as a citywide hero after emulating the actions of Wesley Autrey.
The January 2011 premiere of House MD, shows a man named Jack Nash who heroically saves a woman stuck in the throes of a seizure on the subway tracks. Nash, deemed by the press "The Subway Hero," collapses afterward from injuries unrelated to the train incident.

References

1956 births
Living people
Military personnel from New York City
American builders
United States Navy sailors